Arthur Francis Durrant (1878–1927), known as Jimmy Durrant, was an English footballer best known as a player for Luton Town and Leicester Fosse.

Career

Durrant joined Luton Town in 1897 from local club Luton Stanley. He stayed with the club throughout their three-year spell in the Football League, and spent four further seasons with Luton Town in the Southern League before signing for Leicester Fosse in 1904.

After five years with Leicester, Durrant joined non-League Leyton, where he stayed for four seasons before rejoining Luton. He played a full season at the club, before retiring early in the 1914–15 season.

References

1878 births
Footballers from Luton
English footballers
English Football League players
Southern Football League players
Luton Town F.C. players
Leicester City F.C. players
1927 deaths
Leyton F.C. players
Association football wingers